Nearly Departed is an American sitcom that aired on NBC on Monday nights from April 10, 1989 to May 1, 1989. It was an updated version of Topper.

Premise
The series focused on English professor Grant Pritchard and his wife Claire who are killed in a rockslide. They return to their home as ghosts to find plumbing contractor Mike Dooley and his wife Liz, son Derek, and his father, Jack, living there. Grandpa Jack was the only one who could see and hear the Pritchards. In exchange for continuing to live in the house as ghosts, the Pritchards would mediate through Grandpa Jack and try to help the Dooleys with their problems. In one such instance, Derek was doing poorly in school because he was intimidated by bullies; Grant and Claire use their abilities to scare off the bullies.

Cast
Eric Idle as Grant Pritchard
Caroline McWilliams as Claire Pritchard
Stuart Pankin as Mike Dooley
Wendy Schaal as Liz Dooley
Jay Lambert as Derek Dooley
Henderson Forsythe as Grandpa Jack Garrett

Episodes

References

External links
 

1989 American television series debuts
1989 American television series endings
1980s American sitcoms
American fantasy television series
Fantasy comedy television series
Ghosts in television
NBC original programming
Television series by Lorimar Television
Television shows set in Chicago